Sawmill Pass, is a mountain pass in the southern Sierra Nevada, California on the border of the Inyo National Forest (John Muir Wilderness) to the east and Kings Canyon National Park to the west. The eastern approach via the Sawmill Pass Trail is steep and strenuous, climbing  from the Owens Valley floor. To the west, it connects to the John Muir Trail/Pacific Crest Trail in the Sierra high country, along Woods Creek.

References

Mountain passes of the Sierra Nevada (United States)
Kings Canyon National Park